La Dama del mar is a 1954 black-and-white Argentine film directed by Mario Soffici. It is based on the play The Lady from the Sea by Henrik Ibsen.

Cast

In order of credits: 
Zully Moreno	
Alberto Closas		
Roberto Airaldi		
Ernesto Bianco		
Carlos Cotto		
Mirtha Torres		
Nina Brian		
Fernando Labat		
Jacques Arndt		
Adolfo Calcaño		
Jesús Pampín

References

External links
 

1954 films
1950s Spanish-language films
Argentine black-and-white films
Films based on works by Henrik Ibsen
Argentine drama films
1954 drama films
1950s Argentine films